Punapedaliodes  is a Neotropical genus of butterflies in the family Nymphalidae.

Species
Punapedaliodes albopunctata (Weymer, 1890)
Punapedaliodes flavopunctata (Staudinger, 1894)

References

Satyrini
Nymphalidae of South America
Nymphalidae genera
Taxa named by Walter Forster (entomologist)